Hilakku was one of the Neo-Hittite states during the Iron Age in southern Anatolia during the 1st millennium BC.

Hilakku was south of the Neo-Hittite state of Tabal, west of Que, and north of the Mediterranean sea.  It covered the land of Cilicia Tracheia, (Latin Aspera) of the Classical age, otherwise known as 'Rough Cilicia'. It was also within the south-eastern frontiers of the Hittite appanage domain of Tarhuntassa.

See also
Hittites
Luwians
Aramaeans
Bronze Age

References

Sources
Trevor Bryce, The Peoples and Places of Ancient Western Asia, Routledge, Oxon, 2011, 

Trevor Bryce, The Kingdom of Hittites, Oxford University Press, New York, 2005, 

Trevor Bryce, The World of the Neo-Hittite Kingdoms: A Political and Military History, Oxford University Press, New York, 2012, 

Syro-Hittite states
Ancient Syria
Iron Age Anatolia